Pattabhiramaiah  Sheshadri (born 23 November 1963) is an Indian film director who works in Kannada cinema. He is known for his films Munnudi, Atithi, Beru, Tutturi, Vimukthi, Bettada Jeeva, Bharath Stores and December-1. He has also worked as a director in various television serials.

Sheshadri became the first director to win a National Film Award eight times consecutively when his film December-1 won the National Film Award for Best Feature Film in Kannada and the National Film Award for Best Screenplay.

Early life and education 

Sheshadri was born on 23 November 1963 in the village of Dandinashivara in Karnataka to Pattabhiramaiah, a primary school teacher, and Kamalamma. He is the youngest of four siblings. He completed his Master's degree in Kannada literature and also received a Diploma in journalism.

Career

Before 1990: Journalism
Sheshadri began his career working at Navakarnataka Prakashana, a publishing house, where he designed cover pages for the publication. His next job was at Suddi Sangaati, a Kannada weekly. He wrote film reviews and features on films during his time there which provided him an opportunity to understand the Kannada film industry. He began attending film festivals where he was exposed to world cinema for the first time. This inspired him to make his own films.

1990–1995: Entry into films
Sheshadri started working in films and television by writing scripts and assisting the established Kannada film director T. S. Nagabharana.

1995–2000: Working in television
Sheshadri began to direct television serials as a way to earn a living. His first serial was Inchara in 1995 followed by Kamanabillu and Kathegaara in 1996 and Maayamruga in 1999.

2000–present: First film and directorial career
During the 31st International Film Festival of India in New Delhi in 2000, Sheshadri watched the Malayalam film Karunam which had won the Best Feature Film award at the festival. He learnt during a conversation with the film's director that it was made on a budget of ₹1 million. This gave him the confidence that a film could be made with a small budget.

Sheshadri then decided to adapt Bolwar Mahammad Kunhi's book Muttuchera into a film titled Munnudi. He approached numerous producers assuring them he could make the film on a budget of ₹1 million but he was turned down by all of them and was also told that no Hindus would watch the film as all the characters in the story are Muslims and no Muslims would watch the film either since the story speaks up against their beliefs.

It was at this point that the idea to finance the film in a cooperative model struck him and he approached his friends from the film industry who each agreed to invest ₹100,000 each into the project. Munnudi ended up making a profit of ₹1 million at the end of its run.

Sheshadri and his friends decided to invest those profits into making his next film titled Atithi which starred Prakash Raj in the lead role.
Sheshadri has continued to use this cooperative model and has financed five of his films using this method.

Filmography

Films

Television

Awards

For his Contribution to Kannada Cinema, awarded Honorary Puttanna Kanagal Award in Karnataka State Film Awards 2018.

National Film Awards

Karnataka State Film Award

Dhaka International Film Festival

References

External links
 Official website
 P. Sheshadri at Youtube
 

Living people
Film directors from Karnataka
Kannada film directors
Indian male screenwriters
Film producers from Karnataka
Kannada film producers
21st-century Indian film directors
1963 births
People from Tumkur district
Best Original Screenplay National Film Award winners
Directors who won the Best Film on Environment Conservation/Preservation National Film Award
Directors who won the Best Film on Other Social Issues National Film Award